Watpa Salawan (Thai วัดป่าสาลวัน) is a Thai Theravada Buddhist ( Thai ธรรมยุต tam-má-yóot) forest temple located in downtown Nakhon Ratchasima, Thailand.

External links
 forest temple

Pa Salawan